Salt Run is a stream located entirely within Warren County, Ohio.

Salt Run was named for the salt lick along its course.

See also
List of rivers of Ohio

References

Rivers of Warren County, Ohio
Rivers of Ohio